Suddenly at Midnight (also known as Suddenly in the Dark or Suddenly in Dark Night) is a 1981 South Korean erotic cult horror film as well as a thriller film directed by Ko Young-nam.

Plot 
Kang Yu-jin, a wealthy biology professor doing a butterfly field study, takes in a new housemaid; the young woman, Mi-ok, is the daughter of a shaman priestess who recently died in a house fire. At first, Yu-jin and his wife, Seon-hee, welcome Mi-ok into their home, but Seon-hee begins to have misgivings when she sees a strange wooden doll that the maid has brought with her. Having suffered from nightmares about exactly the same doll, Seon-hee becomes increasingly suspicious and paranoid that Mi-ok is trying to kill her and usurp her household. In a sudden fit of madness, Seon-hee causes Mi-ok to fall to her death. From then on, Seon-hee is tormented horribly by visions of the doll attacking her and it starts to take a great toll on her sanity. Is it actually happening or just all in the girl's mind?

Cast 
 Kim Young-ae ... Seon-hee
 Yoon Il-bong ... Kang Yu-jin
 Lee Ki-seon ... Mi-ok
 Hyun Hye-ri
 Kim Geun-hie
 Kim Min-gyu
 Kim Gi-jong
 Lee Yae-sung
 Gwak Geon
 Yoo Myeong-sun

Release 
Suddenly at Midnight was released in South Korea on 17 July 1981, and received a total of 28,178 admissions. It was then subsequently released on Blu-ray for the first time ever worldwide in early 2017 by Mondo Macabro.

Critical response 
The movie and Ko Young-nam are referred to as a classic work and director of Korean horror film. In a review for Koreanfilm.org, Darcy Paquet cited Suddenly at Midnight as a rare example of 1970s-80s Korean horror that was genuinely frightening, describing it as "a mysterious psychological study... that beguiles the viewer right up to its bizarre closing image." He praised the film's direction, saying, "Ko has a good feel for how to create tension from precise editing and the patient accumulation of evocative details", and also credited actress Kim Young-ae for a "convincing performance as the panicked wife". In contemporary times (especially ever since being released on Blu-ray by Mondo Macabro) it has still managed to become a real cult classic, more or less, in addition to what many people have called a "hidden gem" for its stylish, unique, surreal, and visually-stunning cinematography/direction, plus the hallucinatory as well as overall eerie atmospheric nature of the movie. Not to mention same with the multiple red herrings that are also present within the film.

References

External links 
 
 

1981 films
1980s Korean-language films
South Korean horror films
1981 horror films
Erotic horror films